Carbohydrate Research is a peer-reviewed scientific journal covering research on the chemistry of carbohydrates. It is published by Elsevier and was established in 1965. The editor-in-chief is M. Carmen Galan (University of Bristol). According to the Journal Citation Reports, the journal has a 2014 impact factor of 1.929.

References

External links 
 

Biochemistry journals
Elsevier academic journals
Publications established in 1965
English-language journals
Carbohydrate chemistry